Mona Barthel was the defending champion, but chose to participate at the 2012 US Open Grand Slam instead.

Karin Knapp won the title, defeating Estrella Cabeza Candela in the final, 6–1, 3–6, 6–1.

Seeds

Main draw

Finals

Top half

Bottom half

References 
 Main draw
 Qualifying draw

Save Cup - Singles
Save Cup
2012 in Italian tennis